John Richard Saunders (December 9, 1869 – March 17, 1934) was an American lawyer and politician who served as Attorney General of Virginia from 1918 until his death in 1934. Prior to this, he was a member of the Senate of Virginia. He was a supporter of women's suffrage while in the Senate. He was married to Blanche Hoskins Saunders who was a member of the Equal Suffrage League of Saluda.

Electoral history

References

External links
 
 

1869 births
1934 deaths
Virginia Attorneys General
Democratic Party Virginia state senators
Virginia lawyers
People from King and Queen County, Virginia
20th-century American politicians
20th-century American lawyers